An Amortising swap  is usually an interest rate swap in which the notional principal for the interest payments declines (i.e. is paid down) during the life of the swap, perhaps at a rate tied to the prepayment of a mortgage or to an interest rate benchmark such as the London Interbank Offered Rate (Libor). 
It is the opposite of the accreting swap.
If the swap allows for uncertain contingent ups and downs in the notional principal, it is called a "roller-coaster swap".

References
Sources

Further reading
 Mark Rubinstein Rubinstein on Derivatives. Futures, Options and Dynamic Strategies 1999 

Interest rates
Swaps (finance)